Emanuel Vignato (born 24 August 2000) is an Italian professional footballer who plays as midfielder for  club Empoli, on loan from Bologna.

Club career

Bologna

Loan to Chievo
On 20 January 2020, he signed a contract with Bologna and was loaned back to Chievo for the remainder of the 2019–20 season.

Loan to Empoli
On 31 January 2023, Vignato joined Empoli on a year-and-a-half-long loan with an option to buy.

International career
Vignato was born in Italy to an Italian father and a Brazilian mother. He was called up to represent both Brazil U17, without playing a match. He opted to represent Italy, playing for their under-17 team.

On 8 October 2021 he made his debut with the Italy U21 squad, playing as a starter and scoring a goal in the qualifying match won 2–1 against Bosnia and Herzegovina in Zenica.

Personal life 
Vignato's brother, Samuele, is also a professional footballer.

Career statistics

Club

References

2000 births
Living people
Sportspeople from the Province of Verona
Footballers from Veneto
Association football midfielders
Italian footballers
Italy youth international footballers
Brazilian footballers
Italian people of Brazilian descent
Brazilian people of Italian descent
Serie A players
A.C. ChievoVerona players
Bologna F.C. 1909 players
Empoli F.C. players
Competitors at the 2018 Mediterranean Games
Mediterranean Games silver medalists for Italy
Mediterranean Games medalists in football